Dixie, Mathews County is an unincorporated community in Mathews County, in the Commonwealth of Virginia.

References

Unincorporated communities in Virginia
Unincorporated communities in Mathews County, Virginia